Pic de Noufonts is a mountain of Catalonia.

References

Mountains of Catalonia
Mountains of the Pyrenees